Paris-Deauville is a 1934 French comedy film directed by Jean Delannoy and starring Marguerite Moreno, Monique Rolland and Germaine Sablon.

The film's sets were designed by the art director Roger Caccia.

Cast
 Marguerite Moreno as La duchesse de Latour Lupé 
 Monique Rolland as Gilberte 
 Germaine Sablon as Baronne Paulette de Sempé 
 André Roanne as Jacques Duplan 
 Armand Bernard as Sosthène 
 Tichadel as Cruchadouze, le compositeur gaffeur 
 Georges Bever as Joseph

References

Bibliography 
 Bertram M. Gordon. War Tourism: Second World War France from Defeat and Occupation to the Creation of Heritage. Cornell University Press, Nov 2018.

External links 
 

1934 films
1934 comedy films
French comedy films
1930s French-language films
Films directed by Jean Delannoy
French black-and-white films
1930s French films